Hellmut Andics (25 August 192219 August 1998) was an Austrian journalist, publicist and writer.

Life 
After military service in World War II Andics became a journalist and worked as an editor, at The New Austria and Die Presse.

From 1 March 1979 to 31 December 1980 Andics was director of the Burgenland Festival. From 11 October 1982 to 27 October 1986, he was director of the ORF Regional Studio Burgenland.

He is best known for its contemporary history reports and documentaries. He also wrote the screenplay for the television series Ringstraßenpalais and for the five-part documentary television film , which the ZDF produced in 1967 under the direction of Wolfgang Schleif. He also had the idea for the television series  by Bernd Fischerauer. Andics was the father of two sons (Eric and Maximilian) and had three grandchildren (Daniel, Therese and Sophie).

Hellmut Andics died in his apartment in Vienna in the early morning hours of August 19, 1998, of heart failure. He was cremated at Feuerhalle Simmering, where also his ashes are buried.

Literature 
 1970: Dr.-Karl-Renner-journalism Price
 1992: Cultural Prize of Burgenland

Works
 1960: The state that nobody wanted
 1964: The vices of this time
 1965: The case of Otto Habsburg. A Report
 1965: The Eternal Jew. Causes and history of anti-Semitism. Published by Fritz Molden
 1967: The Great Terror. From the beginning of the Russian Revolution to the death of Stalin
 1968: 50 years of our lives. Austria's fate since 1918
 1969: The women of the Habsburgs
 1974: The Austrian century. The Austro-Hungarian Empire 1804-1918
 1976: The sinking of the Austro-Hungarian Empire. Austria-Hungary from the turn of the century until November 1918
 1976: The Isle of the Blessed. Austria of the Moscow Declaration to the present Convention
 1977: Meeting on the Danube
 1981: Founder time. The black and yellow Vienna until 1867
 1983: Ringstrasse world. Vienna 1867-1887
 1984: Luegerzeit. The Black Vienna until 1918
 1988: The Jews of Vienna

Filmography

Film
 Endangered Girls (dir. Wolfgang Glück, 1958)
  (dir. Géza von Bolváry, 1958)
 The Street (dir. Hermann Kugelstadt, 1958)
 The Priest and the Girl (dir. Gustav Ucicky, 1958)
 Girls for the Mambo-Bar (dir. Wolfgang Glück, 1959)
 Twelve Girls and One Man (dir. Hans Quest, 1959)
 Treffpunkt Salon Parisi / Frauen in Teufels Hand (dir. Hermann Leitner, 1960)
  (dir. Edwin Zbonek, 1962)
 Wenn beide schuldig werden (dir. Hermann Leitner, 1962)
 Der rote Rausch (dir. Wolfgang Schleif, 1962)

Television
 Wolken über Kaprun (dir. Franz Josef Gottlieb, 1964, TV series)
 : Der Fall Nebe (dir. Georg Tressler, 1964, TV series episode)
 An der schönen blauen Donau (dir. , 1965)
 Der Fall Auer/Ranneth – Unschuldig hinter Gittern (dir. , 1966)
 Der Fall der Generale (dir. , 1966)
 Der rasende Reporter – Egon Erwin Kisch (dir. Robert A. Stemmle, 1967)
  (dir. Wolfgang Schleif, 1967–1968, TV miniseries)
 Sir Roger Casement (dir. Hermann Kugelstadt, 1968)
 The Spanish Civil War (dir. Rudolph Cartier, 1969)
 Der Baum von Kfar Etzyon (dir. Georg Tressler, 1969)
  (dir. , 1969)
 Friedrich III – Gestorben als Kaiser (dir. Rudolf Nussgruber, 1970)
 The Death of Deputy Jean Jaurès (dir. , 1970)
 The Bavarian Soviet Republic (dir. Helmut Ashley, 1971)
  (dir. Axel Corti, 1971)
 Sacro Egoismo oder Der Bruch der Achse – Der Kriegsaustritt Italiens im Jahre 1943 (dir. Rudolf Nussgruber, 1971)
 Emperor Charles' Last Battle (dir. Rudolf Nussgruber, 1971)
  (dir. Helmut Ashley, 1971)
 That's Me – Vienna Fates of the '30s: Austria Between Democracy and Dictatorship (dir. Rudolf Nussgruber, 1972)
 If You Want, It Is Not a Fairy Tale (dir. , 1973)
 You Will Not Die Alone – A German Military Chaplain in Paris (dir. Jürgen Goslar, 1973)
 The Isle of the Blessed (dir. , 1976)
 Ringstraßenpalais (dir. Rudolf Nussgruber, 1980–1986, TV series)
 Roda Rodas rote Weste – Ein Leben in Anekdoten (dir. Rolf von Sydow, 1983)
 Hot Days in July (dir. , 1984)
  (dir. , 1994–1995, TV miniseries)

External links

1922 births
1998 deaths
Journalists from Vienna
Burials at Feuerhalle Simmering
20th-century Austrian screenwriters
20th-century Austrian male writers